The Alpha Ridge is a mountain ridge in Denali Borough, Alaska, United States. Elevation: 3,420 feet.

It is on the west side of the Kantishna Valley in the Denali National Park

References

Ridges of Alaska
Landforms of Denali Borough, Alaska